"Agua Pasada" ("Expired Water") is a song written by Gil Francisco and performed by American salsa singer Frankie Negrón on his second studio album No Me Compares (1998). It was released as the lead single from the album. It became his third number one on the Tropical Airplay chart. On the review of the album, the Newsday critic Richard cited "Agua Pasada" and the title track where George and Negrón "deliver the salsa goods". John Lannert of Billboard called it a "sizzling leadoff single".  "Agua Pasada"  was nominated in the category of Tropical Song of the Year at the 11th Annual Lo Nuestro Awards, but lost to "Suavemente" by Elvis Crespo. It was acknowledged as an award-winning song at the 2000 BMI Latin Awards.

Charts

See also
List of Billboard Tropical Airplay number ones of 1998

References

1998 songs
1998 singles
Frankie Negrón songs
Warner Music Latina singles
Spanish-language songs